Thomas Terrell Sessums (June 11, 1930 – June 6, 2020) was the Speaker of the Florida House of Representatives from 1972 to 1974. Sessums went on to a life of leadership and public service.

Early life
Thomas Terrell Sessums was born June 11, 1930, in Daytona Beach, Florida, United States. He was raised in Jacksonville, Florida, graduated from Andrew Jackson High School and then moved with his family to Tampa, Florida, after he started college.

Education
Sessums graduated from the University of Florida with his bachelor's degree and Juris Doctor and began his law practice in Tampa. While at the University of Florida Sessums was president of the student body (1952–1953) and member of Florida Blue Key. Sessums also served in the United States Air Force.

Politics
He served as a member of the Florida House of Representatives from 1963 - 1974. During the 1972-74 session he served as Speaker of the House.  He was also Chairman of the Florida Board of Regents, and is serving on the Board of Governors for Florida Southern College. He also served as president of the board of trustees at the University of Tampa.

Later years
Sessums has received four honorary degrees (Rollins College, Flagler College, the University of South Florida, and Florida Southern College), and has been awarded the Distinguished Service Award by the Florida Association of Colleges and Universities.

On June 7, 2013, T. Terrell Sessums was honored with the Lifetime Achievement Award from the League of Women Voters of Hillsborough County, Florida.

Sessums resided Tampa for the rest of his life. His wife Neva Sessums died on April 19, 2013.

He died on June 6, 2020.

Legacy
T. Terrell Sessums Elementary School in Riverview, Florida, was named in his honor when it opened in 2003.

In 1965 Terrell Sessums introduced a bill into the Florida Legislature which created the Tampa Sports Authority and which led to the building of the original Tampa Stadium.

In 1967 Terrell Sessums introduced legislation which formed by Special Act the Environmental Protection Commission of Hillsborough County.

In 2009 Terrell Sessums was honored by having a Tampa Bay Environmental Excellence Award named after him. Subsequently, there have been 4 winners of the Terrell Sessums Environmental Award.

Sessums Mall on the campus of the University of South Florida was dedicated in 1999.

References

External links
 T. Terrell Sessums Collection at the University of South Florida
 Sessums Mall at the University of South Florida
 Sessums Elementary School
 Neva S. Sessums obituary
  29 minutes.
 USF Oral History interview with Harris Mullen 1996

People from Daytona Beach, Florida
Military personnel from Florida
Fredric G. Levin College of Law alumni
Florida lawyers
Speakers of the Florida House of Representatives
Democratic Party members of the Florida House of Representatives
1930 births
2020 deaths
Politicians from Jacksonville, Florida
Politicians from Tampa, Florida
United States Air Force officers